Lasiocercis ciliata is a species of beetle in the family Cerambycidae. It was described by Lepesme and Villiers in 1944.

References

Lasiocercis
Beetles described in 1944